Talis qinghaiella is a moth in the family Crambidae. It is found in China (Qinghai).

References

Ancylolomiini
Moths described in 1982
Moths of Asia